The Ministry of Human Rights and Citizenship (MDHC), former Ministry of Woman, Family and Human Rights (2019–2022) and Secretariat for Human Rights of the Presidency of the Republic (1997–2015) is an office attached to the Presidency of Brazil. Its purpose is to implement, promote, and protect human rights, civic rights, and the rights of children, adolescents, women, families, the elderly, and the disabled.

Background
The Secretariat was created on 7 April 1997, during the first administration of Fernando Henrique Cardoso.  Originally called the National Human Rights Secretariat (Secretaria Nacional dos Direitos Humanos), it was initially attached to the Ministry of Justice. On 1 January 1999, responsibility for the Secretariat was transferred to the President's office. On 28 May 2002, it was renamed Special Secretariat for Human Rights (Secretaria Especial dos Direitos Humanos). It assumed its current name on 25 March 2010, when it became an essential office of the Presidency.

MDHC is headed by the Minister of Human Rights and Citizenship (Ministro dos Direitos Humanos e Cidadania), a ministerial-level position. The incumbent is Silvio Almeida, who has been in office since 1 January 2023.

International Child Abduction
MDHC operates as the Brazilian Federal Central Authority under the terms of article 6 of the 1993 Hague Adoption Convention. Besides this, the secretariat also acts as the central authority under the terms of article 6 of the 1980 Hague Convention on the Civil Aspects of International Child Abduction. In this respect, it functions as a conduit between other countries' central authorities and the various Regional Federal Tribunals in Brazil which deal with international child abduction cases. In this sense, it is the equivalent of the US Department of State's Office of Children's Issues and the UK's Office of the Official Solicitor.

Any  application for the return of an abducted minor from Brazil must be directed to the central authority of the country from which the child was abducted. This central authority will then contact SDH, which will analyze and verify all the information and decide whether it complies with the requirements provided for under the Convention. Since the Secretariat has only an administrative and informational remit, it maintains a list of private lawyers that it recommends for Hague Convention cases. These lawyers, however, do not generally respond quickly to requests for assistance from abroad and they have been singularly unsuccessful in having children returned to their home countries. The Secretariat is required under its remit to liaise with the Federal Police of the Ministry of Justice and with Interpol, to locate and return minors who are reported as missing. However, reports from the parents of abducted children say that this is rarely done and that the office that deals with these matters is chaotic.

According  to Decree No. 3951/01, SDH has only administrative and informational competence. It cannot decide cases involving parental kidnapping and return and visitation schedules for abducted children.; this is up to the federal courts.

MDHC and Child Abduction in Brazil

The neutrality of MDHC and its respect for international law has come under increased international focus and scrutiny because of growing concerns over International child abduction in Brazil. In the case of Sean Goldman, a child abducted from the US to Brazil in 2004 and held by his mother's family against the wishes of his father, then Special Secretary Paulo Vannuchi intervened publicly, claiming that the child should remain in Brazil even though this amounted to kidnapping and was against the terms of the Hague Convention. In a speech to the Brazilian parliament in April 2009, he claimed that if the child were allowed to visit his father in the US, he might end up being 'kidnapped', even though the child had been abducted to Brazil in the first place. International outrage and a highly public campaign severely damaged the image of SDH and the Brazilian judiciary and Sean Goldman was eventually returned to his father in December 2009 only after the US government withdrew trade benefits from Brazil.

The Special Secretary for Human Rights, in what some have labeled a damage-limitation exercise, visited the US Department of State for a full week in November 2009 to review longstanding cases involving the abduction of US children. During this trip, she and Brazilian Embassy officials met with the parents of children kidnapped and taken to Brazil, NGOs, members of the US Congress and a federal judge who works on Hague Convention cases. The secretary explained in detail resolutions made by the Brazilian Supreme Court and SDH's outreach and education campaign to address Brazilian judges’ lack of familiarity with the Convention and the supreme court's resolutions.

References

External links
Official website of the Ministry of Women, Families and Human Rights

Government ministries of Brazil
Human rights in Brazil
Human rights ministries